Syrmia is a region of Serbia and Croatia.

Syrmia may refer to:

Contemporary 
 Vukovar-Syrmia County, a county in Croatia
 Syrmia District, a district in Serbia
 Diocese of Syrmia  (disambiguation)

Historic
 Sirmium, influential ancient city founded by Illyrians and Celts before 300 BC, capital of Illyricum, destroyed by the Avars in 582 AD. Site of modern Sremska Mitrovica in Serbia.
 Byzantine Syrmia (disambiguation)
 Theme of Sirmium (1018-1071), Byzantine administrative unit
 Syrmia (former county) (12th century-1521, 1745-1848, 1860-1924), initially an administrative unit of the medieval Kingdom of Hungary, and later administrative unit of several Habsburg lands (Kingdom of Slavonia, Kingdom of Croatia, Kingdom of Croatia-Slavonia, Kingdom of Hungary), as well as administrative unit of the Kingdom of Serbs, Croats and Slovenes. Covered historical Upper Syrmia.
 Duchy of Syrmia (disambiguation)
 Kingdom of Syrmia (1282-1325), an independent Serb kingdom centered in historical Lower Syrmia (today known as Mačva). According to some sources, it also included Upper Syrmia.
 Sanjak of Syrmia (1541-1699), an administrative unit of the Ottoman Empire. Covered Upper Syrmia.
 In the past, term Lower Syrmia was a designation for the region of Mačva in Serbia. Northern part of Mačva is now located within modern Srem District.

See also
 Eastern Slavonia, Baranja and Western Syrmia (disambiguation)
 United Nations Transitional Administration for Eastern Slavonia, Baranja and Western Syrmia, a UN peacekeeping mission in eastern parts of Croatia
 Srem (disambiguation)